Journal of Rural Studies is a peer reviewed social science journal published by Elsevier B.V. (originally Pergamon Press). It focuses on present-day rural societies, as well as their economies, cultures and lifestyles. This includes rural geography and agricultural economics. Paul Cloke was the founding editor.

Abstracting and indexing 
 Current Contents
 GEOBASE
 Scopus
 Social Sciences Citation Index

References 

Area studies journals
Elsevier academic journals
Rural society